The following is a discography of singles and albums recorded by American singer Jo Stafford.

Chart hits

A peaked at No. 2 on Hot Country Songs chart
B Peaked at No. 5 on Hot Country Songs chart

Albums

 Kiss Me, Kate (1949)
 Jo Stafford with Gordon MacRae (1949)
 Autumn in New York (1950)
 Songs for Sunday Evening (1950)
 American Folk Songs (1950)
 Songs of Faith (1950)
 As You Desire Me (1952)
 Starring Jo Stafford (1953)
 Broadway's Best (1953)
 A Portrait of New Orleans (1954)
 Garden of Prayer (1954)
 My Heart's in the Highlands (1954)
 Soft and Sentimental (1955)
 Songs of Scotland (1955)
 Memory Songs (1955)
 Happy Holiday (1955)
 Ski Trails (1956)
 A Gal Named Jo (1956)
 Once Over Lightly (1957)
 Swingin' Down Broadway (1958)
 Jo's Greatest Hits (1958)
 I'll Be Seeing You (1959)
 Ballad of the Blues (1959)
 Jonathan and Darlene Edwards in Paris (1960)
 Jo + Jazz (1960)
 Music of My Life (1961)
 Whispering Hope (1962)
 Peace in the Valley (1963)
 Getting Sentimental over Tommy Dorsey (1963)
 The Hits of Jo Stafford (1964)
 Jo Stafford's Sweet Hour of Prayer (1964)
 The Joyful Season (1964)
 This Is Jo Stafford (1966)
 Do I Hear a Waltz? (1966)
 Big Band Sound (1970)
 The Piano Artistry of Jonathan Edwards (1985)
 G.I. Jo (1987)
 Broadway Revisited (1987)
 You Belong to Me (1989)
 America's Most Versatile Singing Star (1990)
 Capitol Collectors series (1991)
 Fabulous Song Stylists (1991)
 You'll Never Walk Alone (1992)
 Greatest Hits (1993)
 16 Most Requested Songs (1995)
 The Very Best of Jo Stafford (1995)
 Say It's Wonderful (1995)
 For You (1995)
 Spotlight on Jo Stafford (1996)
 Jazz (1996)
 Drifting and Dreaming with Jo Stafford (1996)
 The Jo Stafford Story (1997)
 The One and Only (1997)
 Walkin' My Baby Back Home (1998)
 G.I. Jo Sings the Hits (1998)

 Too Marvelous for Words (1998)
 Coming Back Like a Song: 25 Hits 1941-47 (1998)
 No Other Love (1998)
 Jo Stafford (1940-44) (1998)
 Happy Holidays: I Love the Winter Weather (1999)
 Jo + Broadway (1999)
 Jo + Blues (1999)
 Songs of Faith, Hope and Love (1999)
 Just Reminiscin' (2000)
 Jo & Friends (2000)
 The Columbia Hits Collection (2001)
 Candy (2001)
 Haunted Heart (2001)
 A You're Adorable (2001)
 International Hits (2001)
 Cocktail Hour (2001)
 The Magic of Jo Stafford (2001)
 My Darling, My Darling (2001)
 Jo Stafford on Capitol (2001)
 The Old Rugged Cross (2001)
 Best of the War Years (2001)
 Platinum Collection (2001)
 The Two of Us (2001)
 Yes Indeed (2002)
 I Remember You (2002)
 The Ultimate (2002)
 The Best of Jo Stafford (2003)
 Meet Jo Stafford (2003)
 The Columbia Singles Collection, Vol. 1 (2004)
 You Belong to Me (Memoir) (2004)
 You Belong to Me (Remember) (2004)
 You Belong to Me (Rajon) (2004)
 You Belong to Me (ASV/Living Era) (2004)
 Stars of the Summer Night (2004)
 Over the Rainbow (2004)
 Alone and Together (2005)
 Memories Are Made of These (2005)
 Love, Mystery and Adventure (2006)
 Sincerely Yours (2006)
 This is Gold (2006)
 Vintage Years (2006)
 All Hits! (2006)
 Ultimate Capitol Collection (2007)
 Jo Stafford and Friends (2007)
 Blues in the Night (2007)
 Her Greatest Hits (2008)
 You Belong to Me (2008)
 The Capitol Rarities 1943-1950 (2009)
 Reflections: The Ultimate Collection (2009)
 Beyond the Stars: Key Recordings 1940-1959 (2010)
 The Best of Jo Stafford (2010)
 At the Supper Club (2010)
 At the Supper Club II (2011)
 At the Supper Club III (2011)
 For You (2011)

References

Discographies of American artists
Discography